The 890s decade ran from January 1, 890, to December 31, 899.

Significant people
 Al-Mu'tamid
 Al-Mu'tadid
 Abdallah ibn al-Mu'tazz
 Charles the Simple

References

Sources